J. Buck's was a restaurant chain named after the Buck family of broadcasters, Jack Buck, Joe Buck, and Julie Buck. Established in 1999, J. Buck's operated 2 restaurants in Greater St. Louis, Missouri. The franchise closed on October 31, 2015.

History
The restaurant chain was originally opened and operated by Ted Geiger of WAG restaurants. The Buck family did not have ownership in the company, but instead received royalties for the use of likenesses. The chain expanded to 7 locations. However, in October 2008, 5 of the locations closed, with the chain being taken over by Bodley Buck LLC, an investment company which included siblings Joe and Julie Buck, the children of Jack Buck. After more than 15 years, the franchise is set to close its final locations on October 31, 2015.

Locations
J. Buck's had two locations in Missouri; one is St. Louis, and another in Clayton. Both closed on October 31, 2015.

Menu
J. Buck's introduced a new, expanded menu in January 2009 featuring salads, sandwiches, pizzas and entrees along with desserts and daily specials.

See also
 St. Louis cuisine

References

External links
 Official website

Companies based in St. Louis
Restaurants in St. Louis
Defunct restaurants in the United States
Restaurants established in 1999
1999 establishments in Missouri
Restaurants disestablished in 2015